Croma Security Solutions Group PLC (CSS Group PLC or Croma Security) ( previously Access Lock and Key ) is a holding company for a group of four security companies.  It is publicly traded on the London Stock Exchange Group AIM market and is based in the Solent Business Park, Whiteley, Hampshire. It has further offices in London, Dumfries, and Abu Dhabi, with Locksmith outlets along the South Coast.  The group is involved in many aspects of security from guarding to locksmithing and many types of electronic security.

The group currently employs (through its subsidiaries) over 750 people, with a mixture of skill-sets including security officers and engineers. Its operations span most of the UK (with some work in the Middle East)and has a diverse client base from domestic customers to FTSE 100 companies and other 'Blue Chip' organisations.  The present structure was formed by the "reverse acquisition" of the Southampton-based CSS Group of companies by Dumfries based Croma Group PLC.

RECENT NEWS

History

County Locksmiths (Hants) Ltd and the foundations
On 18 February 1970 Fernando Fiorentino founded County Locksmiths Security Ltd, after learning the trade from his father in Tripoli, Libya. The shop, based at 324 Shirley Road, Shirley, Southampton offered basic key-cutting, lock installation and changing, and emergency call-outs.
In 1981, age 18, Roberto Fiorentino (Fernando's first son) joined County Locksmiths where he learnt the locksmithing trade under guidance from his father, helping him grow the single shop business into three very profitable branches: Shirley, Bitterne and Chandlers Ford. The Shirley branch later moved from 324 Shirley road to number 346 in 1981, where the headquarters for the Locksmith division remained until 9 December 2015.

County Access Systems and CSS Total Security
1989 saw Roberto start his own security business, County Access Systems Ltd(CAS), (what would later become County Security Systems and then CSS Total Security Ltd) – offering electronic security systems, including access control, & CCTV systems, broadening the scope of services that could be provided. Roberto still worked closely in partnership with CLS throughout this time, and even operated from the same premises.

In the early 1990s CSS (County Security Systems), began exploring and implementing remote CCTV viewing over phone line connection. Roberto then purchased CLS from his father in 1997. Over the first few years of the millennium, CSS became one of the first security companies to remotely view cameras on a smartphone, over a mobile data connection. During this period, the company also began using, designing, and installing biometric systems such as iris scanning and fingerprint technology.

In 2003, CSS partnered up with Cieffe and began investigating and offering video analytics to clients with high-specification CCTV systems. Revenue parking entered the scene in 2007, bringing many large contracts along with it. CSS's operations extended as far afield as Scotland in 2010 with a new office opening, broadening the companies horizons, and creating greater market opportunities. CSS acquired Alarm Bell Ltd in 2011, adding Fire Alarm and safety systems to CSS's product and service portfolio, along with becoming close business partners with Scotland-based Croma Group PLC, comprising Vigilant Security Services, and Photobase Ltd. This allowed CSS to offer Close Protection, Keyholding, Manned Guarding, and further biometric security services to its customers. Photobase was responsible for creating the software / hardware system which is FastVein™. After the acquisition of Alarm Bell Ltd & Arlo Parking Ltd, CSS Total Security & County Locksmiths became known as the CSS Group.

Reverse takeover and flotation
In June 2012, Croma Group PLC and the CSS Group went through a merger and flotation on the AIM market, with the intention of becoming the UK's leading Total Security Services Provider, with former Black Watch and Special Forces Officer Sebastian Morley as chairman, and Roberto Fiorentino in the position of CEO. The companies TIDM changed from CMG.L to CSSG.L.  As of the takeover, Croma Security Solutions Group PLC (CSSG) was born, offering comprehensive and turnkey security solutions to HNWIs, UHNWIs, and large corporate clients.

Acquisition Of Access Key & Lock
On 9 December 2015 Croma Security Solutions Group PLC formally announced its acquisition of Access Locksmiths Ltd t/a Access Key & Lock. Access Key & Lock was founded and owned by former County Locksmiths employee Mark Whettingsteel, who will now join The Board as an executive director, and act as managing director for the newly formed 'Croma Locksmiths & Security Solutions' Division. In the financial year prior to the acquisition, Access' turnover was GBP2.4 million, with gross profits of GBP300,000. All 38 staff will join the 500+ strong team already employed by the company.

Subsidiaries and portfolio

The group now has four operating subsidiaries, most of which operate from different regions and offices due to the geographical diversity and nature of its contracts and customer portfolio.

Croma Locksmiths (and Security Solutions)
'Croma Locksmiths' comprises the businesses of CSS Locksmiths Ltd, and as of 9 December 2015, Access Locksmiths Ltd. The division's services include the supply, installation, and maintenance of locks, safes, keys, and other ironmongery and door furniture. The Division operates from 10+ locations along the South Coast:
 Ascot
 Basingstoke
 Bournemouth
 Brighton
 Fareham
 Portsmouth
 Southampton (Portswood)
 Southampton (Shirley)
 Winchester
 Warrington

All branches operate an emergency call-out service.

Croma Biometrics
Croma Biometrics is the biometric division of the group, focusing much of its efforts on FastVein™, its proprietary software/hardware vein recognition technology which was developed with Hitachi. The biometrics division comprises Photobase Ltd, and some previous CSS Total Security employees. This division is heavily involved in Research & Development. Its services include identity management, Time and attendance solutions, and Access Control.

Croma Biometric's Fastvein product was used in the London 2012 Olympic Games, with Chief Superintendent, David Griffith of Dorset Police describing it as 'excellent'. It was also installed in 18 HM Prisons, for bailing and enrolling inmates, as well as providing control over visitors.

Croma Biometrics announced on 2 October 2015 the official launch of its Time & Attendance offering, Fastvein™ T&A. The solution features a web-based platform accessible from almost any internet enabled device and claims to 'far exceed[s] the benefits of a traditional card or token system'.

On 13 and 14 December 2015, both the Sunday Times reported that CSS Group PLC has developed spin off of Fastvein™ for use in educational establishments. Predominantly, the system replaces traditional register taking activities and asks pupils to scan their fingers to demonstrate attendance. Further to this, and more specifically for Boarding Schools and Public Schools, pupils can request time to leave the school grounds via touch screen interfaces linked to the system, this is forwarded to Housemasters who may then authorise their absence or time off. If the pupils do return or scan within a certain time frame of the time they specified they would return by, teachers receive email alerts and a prompt to telephone the pupils. The system also issues a fire register when the alarm is triggered.

Croma Vigilant
Croma Vigilant is the group's 'manpower', investigations and Asset Protection branch, supplying Manned Guarding, Keyholding, Close protection, private investigation and covert surveillance. Croma Vigilant is a trading style of Vigilant Security Services Ltd and is run by Major Sebastian Morley, the group's executive chairman who famously ended his military career as a squadron commander of 23 SAS amid claims that the military was "under resourced" and attributed the deaths of numerous servicemen to this.

Given Morley's background, a strong military ethos  has been adopted and is emphasised throughout; close to all personnel are ex-forces, a large tranche of these are ex-Special Forces.

Croma Security Systems
Croma Security Systems  is the electronic security division of the group, engaged in the consultation, design, supply, installation, maintenance and servicing of bespoke integrated CCTV, intruder alarm, fire alarm, access control and revenue parking systems. The division operates a rabble of engineers and a fleet of corresponding vehicles to allocate and delegate its works. Croma Security Systems comprises predominantly CSS Total Security Ltd, but includes other companies purchased by CSS Total Security Ltd prior the reverse takeover of Croma Group PLC, including Alarm Bell Ltd and Arlo Parking Ltd.

Most of the divisions work takes place on the South Coast, however increasing demand for its services in London and Scotland led to the addition of engineers to the roster in these locations also. Croma Security Systems heavily supports local businesses and communities, including Hampshire County Council and Southampton City Council, and even undertook charitable work for an arson-hit nursery.

Board
 Chairman - Sebastian Morley
 Chief Executive Officer - Roberto Fiorentino
 Financial Director - Richard Juett
 Executive Operations Director - Paul Williamson
 Non-Executive Director - Nick Hewson
 Non-Executive Director - Charlie McMicking

References

1970 establishments in England
Companies listed on the London Stock Exchange